Uli Jon Roth (born Ulrich Roth; 18 December 1954) is a German guitarist who became famous for his work with the hard rock band Scorpions and is one of the earliest contributors to the neoclassical metal genre. He is also the founder of Sky Academy and designer of the Sky Guitar. He is the older brother of fellow guitarist and artist Zeno Roth (1956–2018).

Career

Dawn Road and Scorpions
Roth formed a band called Dawn Road in the early 1970s. When guitarist Michael Schenker left the Scorpions to join UFO in 1973, the two remaining Scorpions members Rudolf Schenker and Klaus Meine joined the four members of Dawn Road, but decided to use the name Scorpions rather than the less-well-known Dawn Road. Scorpions released four studio albums during his tenure as lead guitarist, main songwriter and occasional lead singer between 1974 and 1977.

Electric Sun
Roth formed his own band named Electric Sun—releasing three albums: Earthquake (1979) dedicated to the spirit of Jimi Hendrix, Fire Wind (1981), dedicated to Anwar Sadat and featured a song called "Enola Gay (Hiroshima Today?)" about the atomic bombing of Japan by a Boeing B-29 Superfortress bomber of that name, and his third and final Electric Sun album Beyond the Astral Skies (1985), dedicated both to Martin Luther King Jr. and to Roth's fans. This final album featured ex-Jethro Tull drummer Clive Bunker, on drums and timpani.

Solo career 
Roth entered a new phase of creative work after Electric Sun, composing four symphonies and two concertos and sometimes performing with symphony orchestras throughout Europe. Roth used the name "Uli Jon Roth" for all subsequent album releases and concert appearances.

The G3 European tour of 1998 featured Roth playing with Joe Satriani and Michael Schenker. The show at London Wembley Arena also featured a jam with Brian May.

Roth played at the outdoor rock festival at Castle Donington in 2001 (also featuring original Scorpions lead guitarist Michael Schenker on the bill). This was filmed and subsequently released on DVD.

Roth appeared in concert with Scorpions onstage at the Wacken Open Air Festival in 2006 along with two other former members of the band. Billed as "A Night to Remember; A Journey Through Time", the Scorpions played four songs from the Roth Era, most of which they had not played live since Roth had left in 1978. This concert was also filmed and released on DVD.

Although this was meant to be a "one night only" special event, its success meant that the format was repeated on several tours subsequently.

At the Rock am Ring festival in Germany in June 2007, Roth joined The Smashing Pumpkins on-stage for their epic closing song "Gossamer." He made another appearance with the Pumpkins upon their return to Germany on 26 February 2008.

Roth had begun working on a new full-length studio album in 2007 which was to be released the following year. The title of the album would be: "Under A Dark Sky" and was going to be the first official release in the long-awaited series of Symphonic Legends (a cycle of music written by Uli for his all-encompassing Sky of Avalon project.)

Roth debuted songs from "Under a Dark Sky" on 18 July 2008 in his headline set at the G-TARanaki Guitar Festival in New Zealand. This was his first concert in the country. Roth also took his "Sky Academy" tuition classes to Taranaki, Waitara, Inglewood and Ōpunake. Guests musicians included Vernon Reid and Gilby Clarke.

"Under a Dark Sky" was released in Japan on 20 August 2008 via Marquee records. The European and USA releases followed a month later on 20 September 2008 on the SPV record label.

Uli Jon Roth released a two-CD studio album entitled Scorpions Revisited, which was recorded in 2014 in Hanover in early 2015. Roth revisited his personal favourites from the early Scorpions period.

A tour called The Ultimate Guitar Experience with fellow guitarists Jennifer Batten and Andy Timmons followed. Uli soon thereafter embarked on another world tour: this time playing The Tokyo Tapes, songs from the Scorpions 1978 tour of Japan and ensuing live album.

A double CD and Blu-ray/DVD were released in December 2016 of a concert Uli and his band played in Japan in 2015 commemorating the anniversary of The Tokyo Tapes. Roth concluded a short North American tour in March 2017, highlighting songs from both Scorpions Revisited and Tokyo Tapes.

Roth participated a second time at the G3 European tour with Joe Satriani and John Petrucci in March 2017.

Roth contributed an afterword to the 2017 book Shredders!: The Oral History of Speed Guitar (And More) by Greg Prato.

Sky guitars
Roth commissioned construction of custom guitars with additional frets from luthier Andreas Demetriou in the 1980s. Roth has had five of these "Sky" guitars made. To be able to emulate the high notes of a violin, all of the Sky Guitars have more frets than a typical electric guitar. The first Sky Guitar (used on the album Beyond the Astral Skies) had 30 frets. Later versions of the Sky Guitar overcame the problem of the higher register frets becoming too narrow by widening the frets by whole steps for the highest notes. In an April 2001 Guitar Player magazine interview Roth reported that the guitars are either fretless above the 30th fret, or have whole step fret spacing above the 27th fret, with 35 effective (half step) frets. All of the Sky Guitars with frets have scalloped fretboards. The Sky Guitar's pickups are custom 4-coil humbuckers, made by John Oram, with one guitar having an Oram pickup hidden under the 24th fret. For a time, Roth used a Framus Dragon amplifier, although currently he promotes Blackstar Artisan 100 & Series One 200 Watt heads. He has also used a stalk mounted Vibesware guitar resonator (sustainer) to introduce infinite sustain as on the instrumental Benediction on his Under A Dark Sky album.  Dean Guitars produced 25 Custom Sky Guitars based on Roth's custom models with six and seven strings in 2011.

Playing style

Initially, Roth was inspired by The Beatles, The Jimi Hendrix Experience and Eric Clapton's fretwork on John Mayall & the Bluesbreakers and Cream. He would, later on, reveal his appreciation for fellow 1970 guitar heroes such as Pink Floyd's David Gilmour, Deep Purple's Ritchie Blackmore and Jeff Beck, especially his fusion masterpiece Blow by Blow. In 1971 he began studying piano and classical guitar. His influences broadened, now including spanish guitar virtuoso Andrés Segovia and violinist Yehudi Menuhin.

Roth's solo on Scorpion's "Sails of Charon" - off the Taken by Force album - is notable for impressive speed and precision. The solo displayed a number of classical techniques, weaving pedal point sequences, harmonic / "Middle Eastern" sounding scales and rapid-fire arpeggios. Of note, Metallica's Kirk Hammett famously quoted a portion of this solo on "Battery", the opening song of Master of Puppets (1986).

In Roth's early days with Scorpions, his soloing style was based primarily on the blues scale, occasionally incorporating notes from other modes. However, by the time the band recorded the Virgin Killer album, he began incorporating more advanced compositional elements from European classical music: such as pedal tone sequences and intricate arpeggios. Beginning with Electric Sun, the classical influence began to dominate his playing style- notable in songs like "Cast Away Your Chains" and "Still So Many Lives Away". His style eventually became a fusion of blues-based rock with European classical sensibilities. Roth employs major and minor pentatonic, the blues scale, phrygian, harmonic minor, diminished, and the whole tone scale.

Personal life
Roth was romantically involved with artist Monika Dannemann who was with Jimi Hendrix when he died. Roth and Danneman collaborated on various songs including "We'll Burn the Sky" from Scorpions' Taken by Force

Danneman also painted the album sleeves for all three of the releases by Electric Sun.

Monika Dannemann was convicted of breaking a 1996 British High Court order not to repeat allegations that Kathy Etchingham was an "inveterate liar" for accusing her of playing a role in Jimi Hendrix's death. Although Etchingham asked the judge to jail Dannemann she was released.  Monika Dannemann was found dead in a fume-filled Mercedes-Benz near her cottage in Seaford, East Sussex two days later—aged 50. Her death was ruled a suicide, but Roth publicly stated his opinion that her death was the result of foul play. He dedicated his  later works to the memory of Dannemann.

Roth has been living in the UK for several years. His current home is in Llansilin in Powys.

Roth has been a vegetarian since the Scorpions days.

Roth performed a charity concert of his interpretation of Vivaldi's Four Seasons at Saint Silin's Church in his home town on 21 June 2019. This was an effort to raise money for  help the church.

Legacy
Roth has been on the cover of many guitar magazines and has influenced many notable guitar players including: Billy Corgan, Kirk Hammett, Marty Friedman, Yngwie Malmsteen, Gus G, Andy DiGelsomina, Michael Romeo, Wolf Hoffman, Syu, Eric Peterson of Testament, Hank Shermann of Mercyful Fate, Joe Stump, James Byrd. and Fredrik Åkesson from Opeth and Ghost.

Discography

Unreleased solo works

Guest appearance
 Live at Wacken Open Air 2006 (2006) (DVD)
 The Sunflower Jam 2012 (2012) (DVD)
 Angels Cry 20th Anniversary Tour (2013) (DVD)

Session work
 Disco Motion (1978) lead guitar on "Rock Tell" by The Original Red Apple Orchestra

References

External links 

 
 Music Legends Interview with Uli Jon Roth

Scorpions (band) members
German rock guitarists
German male guitarists
German heavy metal guitarists
Lead guitarists
1954 births
Living people
G3 (tour)
German Christians
Musicians from Düsseldorf
Seven-string guitarists